Stadium Družstevná pri Hornáde is a football stadium near Košice, Slovakia, and is the home stadium of the FC Lokomotíva Košice. Stadium capacity is 1000 (656 seats ), including 204 seats for away fans and 50 VIP seats.

References

Stadium website 

FC Lokomotíva Košice
Football venues in Slovakia
Sports venues completed in 1972